The 1920–21 Iowa State Cyclones men's basketball team (also known informally as Ames) represented Iowa State University during the 1920-21 NCAA College men's basketball season. The Cyclones were coached by Maury Kent, who was in his first and only season with the Cyclones. They played their home games at the State Gymnasium in Ames, Iowa.

They finished the season 10–8, 6–8 in Missouri Valley play to finish in fifth place.

Roster

Schedule and results 

|-
!colspan=6 style=""|Regular Season

|-

References 

Iowa State Cyclones men's basketball seasons
Iowa State
Iowa State Cyc
Iowa State Cyc